Onchidoris tschuktschica is a species of sea slug, a dorid nudibranch, a shell-less marine gastropod mollusc in the family Onchidorididae.

Distribution
This species was described from Metschigman Bay on the Chukchi Peninsula, Bering Sea, on the Pacific Ocean coast of Russia.

References

Onchidorididae
Gastropods described in 1885